The Kanpur Central–Amritsar Weekly Express is an Express train belonging to North Central Railway zone that runs between  and  in India. It is currently being operated with 22445/22446 train numbers on weekly basis.

Service

The 22445/Kanpur–Amritsar Weekly Express has an average speed of 55 km/hr and covers 898 km in 16h 15m. The 22446/Amritsar–Kanpur Weekly Express has an average speed of 55 km/hr and covers 898 km in 16h 15m.

Route and halts 

The important halts of the train are:

Coach composition

The train has standard ICF rakes (LHB rake since December 2018) with max speed of 110 kmph. The train consists of 16 coaches:

 1 AC II Tier
 3 AC III Tier
 5 Sleeper coaches
 5 General
 2 Seating cum Luggage Rake

Traction

Both trains are hauled by a Lucknow Loco Shed-based WDM-3A diesel locomotive from Kanpur to Amritsar and vice versa.

Direction reversal

The train reverses its direction 1 times:

Rake sharing

The train shares its rake with 14151/14152 Kanpur Central–Bandra Terminus Weekly Express and 14151/14152 Kanpur Central–Anand Vihar Terminal Express.

See also 

 Kanpur Central railway station
 Amritsar Junction railway station
 Kanpur Central–Bandra Terminus Weekly Express
 Kanpur Central–Anand Vihar Terminal Express

Notes

References

External links 

 22445/Kanpur - Amritsar Weekly Express
 22446/Amritsar - Kanpur Weekly Express

Transport in Amritsar
Trains from Kanpur
Express trains in India
Rail transport in Uttarakhand
Rail transport in Punjab, India
Rail transport in Haryana
Railway services introduced in 2013